Miss Grand Spain 2016 is the 1st  edition of Miss Grand Spain beauty contest, held at Teatro de la Villa del Conocimiento y las Artes, Mairena del Alcor on 18 July 2016. The Miss Grand Spain 2016 is Adriana Sánchez Rivas from Málaga crowned her successor, Adriana Sánchez Rivas then represented Spain at the Miss Grand International 2016 pageant held on October 25 in United States.

Results

Special awards

Contestants
24 delegates were selected by regional licensees to compete for the national title of Miss Grand Spain 2016.

References

External links

 Miss Grand Spain official website

Grand Spain
Miss Grand Spain
Beauty pageants in Spain